The 1989 European Ladies' Team Championship took place 5–9 July at Golf de Pals in Girona, Catalonia, Spain. It was the 16th women's golf amateur European Ladies' Team Championship.

Venue 
The hosting course, situated in northern Spain, outside Girona, in the coastal region Costa Brava, Catalonia, 80 kilometres (50 miles) north of Barcelona, saw its first holes inaugurated in 1966. It was extended to 18 holes, designed by golf course architect Fred W. Hawtree, in 1970. Two years later the course hosted the 1972 Spanish Open, the very first tournament of the first official season of the European Tour.

The championship course was set up with par 73.

Format 
All participating teams played two qualification rounds of stroke-play with six players, counted the five best scores for each team.

The eight best teams formed flight A, in knock-out match-play over the next three days. The teams were seeded based on their positions after the stroke-play. The first placed team was drawn to play the quarter final against the eight placed team, the second against the seventh, the third against the sixth and the fourth against the fifth. In each match between two nation teams, two 18-hole foursome games and five 18-hole single games were played. Teams were allowed to switch players during the team matches, selecting other players in to the afternoon single games after the morning foursome games. Games all square after 18 holes were declared halved, if the team match was already decided.

The eight teams placed 9–16 in the qualification stroke-play formed Flight B, to play similar knock-out play to decide their final positions.

Teams 
16 nation teams contested the event. Each team consisted of six players.

Players in the leading teams

Other participating teams

Winners 
Four-time-winners team France and six-time-winners team England tied the lead at the opening 36-hole qualifying competition, each with a score of 25 over par 755, with England winning by the tie-breaking better total non-counting scores. 

Individual leader in the 36-hole stroke-play competition was Macarena Campomanes, Spain with a score of 1-under-par 145, three strokes ahead of three players at tied second.

Team France won the gold, earning their fifth title and first since 1975, beating England in the final 4–3. The championship was decided  when Cécilia Mourgue d'Algue, playing captain for team France, beat Helen Dobson, England, on the 19th hole. Mourgue d'Algue represented Sweden in the championship in 1965 and 1967 and in 1989, at age 42, made her fifth appearance representing France, being on the winning team for the first time.

Team Italy earned third place, beating Scotland in the bronze match.

Results 
Qualification round

Team standings

* Note: In the event of a tie the order was determined by the better total non-counting scores.

Individual leaders

 Note: There was no official award for the lowest individual score.

Flight A

Bracket

Final standings

Sources:

See also 
 Espirito Santo Trophy – biennial world amateur team golf championship for women organized by the International Golf Federation.
 European Amateur Team Championship – European amateur team golf championship for men organised by the European Golf Association.

References

External links 
 European Golf Association: Results

European Ladies' Team Championship
Golf tournaments in Spain
European Ladies' Team Championship
European Ladies' Team Championship
European Ladies' Team Championship